Obed Gomez Vargas (born August 5, 2005) is an American professional soccer player who plays as a midfielder for Major League Soccer club Seattle Sounders FC.

Club career

Born in Anchorage, Alaska, Vargas began his career with Cook Inlet Soccer Club before moving to Washington and joining the youth academy for Major League Soccer club Seattle Sounders FC. He played in the academy for two seasons before signing a professional contract with Sounders FC reserve side Tacoma Defiance on May 7, 2021. A couple days later, on May 9, Vargas made his senior debut for Tacoma Defiance in the USL Championship against LA Galaxy II. He started and played 66 minutes as the match ended in a 1–1 draw. On July 22, 2021, Vargas debuted with the Sounders FC.

He made his MLS debut on July 22, 2021, as one of several Tacoma Defiance players called up to the Sounders for a match against Austin FC to replace injured players. At 15 years and 351 days old, Vargas was the third-youngest player in MLS history. He signed a formal Homegrown Player contract with the Sounders in December and became a starter for the team in the first matches of the 2022 season, playing in two CONCACAF Champions League fixtures. Manager Brian Schmetzer described Vargas' play style as similar to that of Cristian Roldan's rookie season, adding he was "going to be a tremendous player for our club".

International career

In March 2020, Vargas was selected to participate in the United States national under-15 team camp. He was called up by the United States national under-20 team in January 2022.

Personal life

Vargas is of Mexican descent and holds dual American and Mexican citizenship. His father played for the youth academy of Monarcas Morelia; his younger brother and two sisters also play soccer.

Career statistics

Club

Honors
Seattle Sounders FC
CONCACAF Champions League: 2022

References

External links
 Profile at Tacoma Defiance

2005 births
Living people
Sportspeople from Anchorage, Alaska
American sportspeople of Mexican descent
American soccer players
Association football midfielders
Tacoma Defiance players
USL Championship players
Soccer players from Alaska
Seattle Sounders FC players
Major League Soccer players
Homegrown Players (MLS)